The 1979–80 Superliga Espanola de Hockey Hielo season was the eighth season of the Superliga Espanola de Hockey Hielo, the top level of ice hockey in Spain. Eight teams participated in the league, and CH Txuri Urdin won the championship.

Standings

External links
Season on hockeyarchives.info

Spain
Liga Nacional de Hockey Hielo seasons
Liga